Bretstein is a former municipality in the district of Murtal in the Austrian state of Styria. Since the 2015 Styria municipal structural reform, it is part of the municipality Pölstal.

Geography
Bretstein lies in the Niedere Tauern.

References

Rottenmann and Wölz Tauern
Cities and towns in Murtal District